High and Mighty is the ninth studio album by British hard rock band Uriah Heep, released in 1976 by Bronze Records in the UK and Warner Bros. Records in the US. High and Mighty was the last Uriah Heep album to feature vocalist and founding member David Byron, who was subsequently fired due to his troubles with alcohol (he later died in 1985) and bassist John Wetton.

John Wetton and Ken Hensley shared vocal duties on the single "One Way or Another".

The original vinyl release was a single sleeve, with the lyrics reproduced on the inner liner.

The album was remastered and reissued by Castle Communications in 1997 with two bonus tracks, and again in 2004 in an expanded deluxe edition.

Reception

The album was not well received, as stylistically it veered from their earlier progressive rock vein into more mainstream territory, and lacked the group's signature lengthy compositions and fantastical subject matter. "Several of the songs find the band flirting with pop elements in a way that doesn't complement their hard rocking style", said Donald A. Guarisco in his retrospective AllMusic review. He added that High and Mighty "shows flashes of the group's old firepower, but is ultimately sunk by a combination of unfocused experimentation and uneven songwriting". Martin Popoff called the album "effeminate, illogical, overblown, grasping for straws", citing only the song "One Way or Another" as "promising" and the rest a squandering of "the band's flickering talents".

Track listing

Personnel
Uriah Heep
 David Byron – vocals (except "One Way or Another")
 Mick Box – lead guitar, acoustic guitar, 12-string acoustic guitar
 Ken Hensley – organ, piano, Moog synthesizer, tubular bells, electric piano, guitar, slide guitar, acoustic guitar, electric 12-string guitar, pedal steel guitar, backing vocals, vocals on "One Way or Another"
 Lee Kerslake – drums, percussion, backing vocals
 John Wetton – bass guitar, Mellotron, electric piano, backing vocals, vocals on "One Way or Another"

Production
 Ashley Howe – engineer
 Peter Gallen – engineer on tracks 1 and 7
 John Gallen – assistant engineer
 Alan Corbeth – mastering at RCA Studios, London
 Mike Brown and Robert Corich – remastering (1997 and 2004 reissues)

Charts

References

Uriah Heep (band) albums
1976 albums
Bronze Records albums
Warner Records albums